Lepra schaereri is a species of crustose lichen in the family Pertusariaceae. It occurs in Europe. It was first described by Swiss pastor and lichenologist Ludwig Schaerer in 1821 as Spiloma isidioides. Josef Hafellner renamed it as Pertusaria schaereri in 2001, and then transferred it to Lepra after that genus was reinstated in 2016 to contain members of the Pertusaria albescens species group.

References

Pertusariales
Lichen species
Lichens described in 2001
Taxa named by Josef Hafellner
Lichens of Europe